Phuphania is a genus air-breathing, tropical land snails. It is a terrestrial, pulmonate, gastropod mollusc in the family Dyakiidae.

Species
The World Register of Marine Species lists:
Phuphania costata C. Tumpeesuwan & S. Tumpeesuwan, 2014
Phuphania crossei (L. Pfeiffer, 1862)
Phuphania globosa C. Tumpeesuwan, Naggs & Panha, 2007 - type species.

References

Gastropod genera
Dyakiidae